Dnipro Dnipropetrovsk is the former name of Ukrainian professional football club in FC Dnipro.

Dnipro Dnipropetrovsk may refer to:

Places
 Dnipro, a city in Ukraine
 Dnipro Raion, a district in Ukraine

Sports
 FC Dnipro-2 Dnipropetrovsk, a Ukrainian reserve football team
 FC Dnipro-3 Dnipropetrovsk, a Ukrainian football team
 FC Dnipro-75 Dnipropetrovsk, a Ukrainian youth football school
 Dnipro (bandy), a Ukrainian bandy club in Dnipro (former Dnipropetrovsk)
 BC Dnipro, a Ukrainian professional basketball club in Dnipro (former Dnipropetrovsk)

See also
 
 Dniprovskyi District (disambiguation)
 Dnipropetrovsk (disambiguation)
 Dnipro (disambiguation)